Hiranuma is a Japanese surname. Notable people with the surname include:

 Kiichirō Hiranuma (1867–1952), 35th Prime Minister of Japan
 Takeo Hiranuma (born 1939), Japanese politician

Japanese-language surnames